Milena Vuković (born 23 February 1986) is a Serbian football goalkeeper currently playing for BIIK Kazygurt in the Austrian Bundesliga at SV Neulengbach. She previously played for ŽFK Sušica, ŽFK Šabac, Mašinac Niš, Napredak Kruševac and ŽFK Požarevac in the Serbian First League. She has played the Champions League with Mašinac and BIIK, and she is a member of the Serbian national team.

References

1986 births
Living people
Women's association football goalkeepers
Serbian women's footballers
Serbia women's international footballers
SV Neulengbach (women) players
Serbian expatriate women's footballers
Serbian expatriate sportspeople in Kazakhstan
Expatriate women's footballers in Kazakhstan
Serbian expatriate sportspeople in Austria
Expatriate women's footballers in Austria
ÖFB-Frauenliga players
BIIK Kazygurt players
ŽFK Mašinac PZP Niš players
ŽFK Crvena zvezda players